Ellen Pennock (born December 18, 1992) is a Canadian triathlete. She competed at several World Cups and international triathlon competitions. She finished 15th at the
2011 World Junior Triathlon Championships and 2nd at the 2013 ITU World Cup in Edmonton, Alberta, Canada. She finished in sixth place in the women's event at the 2015 Pan American Games.

References

External links 
 Athlete biography at triathlon Canada
 Ellen Pennock personal blog

1988 births
Living people
Canadian female triathletes
Triathletes at the 2014 Commonwealth Games
Triathletes at the 2015 Pan American Games
Sportspeople from Calgary
Commonwealth Games competitors for Canada
Pan American Games competitors for Canada
21st-century Canadian women